Karnataka Control of Organised Crimes Act, 2000 (KCOCA) is a law enacted by Karnataka state in India in 2000 to combat organised crime and terrorism. The Act was modeled on the Maharashtra Control of Organised Crime Act, 1999 (MCOCA).

The Act's stated purpose was to fight underworld and organized crime. An amendment bill was passed on 29 July 2009, making four main changes to the Act, adding ′terrorist act′ to purview of ‘organized crime′.

References

2000 in law
Counterterrorism in India
Karnataka state legislation
Organised crime in India
Crime in Karnataka
Law enforcement in Karnataka
2000 in India
Acts related to organized crime